Cydia crassicornis is a moth of the family Tortricidae. It was first described by Lord Walsingham in 1907. It is endemic to the island of Hawaii.

It is known from a single male and is possibly extinct.

References

External links

Species info

Grapholitini
Endemic moths of Hawaii